Kuloy may refer to several places in Russia:

 Kuloy, a town in Arkhangelsk Oblast
 Kuloy (Vaga), tributary of the Vaga in Vologda Oblast and Arkhangelsk Oblast
 Kuloy (White Sea), tributary of the White Sea in Arkhangelsk Oblast